This a list of the people who have served as president of the Institute of Food Technologists since its establishment in 1939.

1939–41: Samuel C. Prescott
1941–42: Laurence V. Burton
1942–43: Roy C. Newton
1943–44: William V. Cruess
1944–45: Fred C. Blanck
1945–46: Fred W. Tanner
1946–47: Ellery R. Harvey
1947–48: George J. Hucker
1948–49: Helmut C. Diehl
1949–50: Carl R. Fellers
1950–51: Paul F. Sharp
1951–52: Charles N. Frey
1952–53: Bernard E. Proctor
1953–54: Berton S. Clark
1954–55: Philip K. Bates
1955–56: LaVerne E. Clifcorn
1956–57: George F. Garantz
1957–58: Emil M. Mrak
1958–59: Askel G. Olsen
1959–60: Ray B. Wakefield
1960–61: Irmi J. Hutchings
1961–62: Harold W. Schultz
1962–63: John M. Jackson
1963–64: C. Olin Ball
1964–65: Charles T. Townsend
1965–66: Maynard A. Joslyn
1966–67: John H. Nair
1967–68: George F. Stewart
1968–69: Bernard L. Oser
1969–70: Herbert E. Robinson
1970–71: Hans Lineweaver
1971–72: Richard L. Hall
1972–73: Ben F. Buchanan
1973–74: Reid T. Milner
1974–75: Charles F. Niven, Jr.
1975–76: Ernest J. Briskey
1976–77: John C. Ayres
1977–78: Howard E. Bauman
1978–79: Bernard S. Schweigert
1979–80: Walter L. Clark
1980–81: Frederick Jack Francis
1981–82: Arthur T. Schramm
1982–83: Owen R. Fennema
1983–84: Gilbert A. Leveille
1984–85: Bernard J. Liska
1985–86: Charles J. Bates
1986–87: John J. Powers
1987–88: Roy E. Morse
1988–89: Theodore P. Labuza
1989–90: Paul F. Hopper
1990–91: Daryl B. Lund
1991–92: John H. Litchfield
1992–93: David R. Lineback
1993–94: Adolph (Al) S. Clausi
1994–95: Roy G. Arnold
1995–96: Francis F. Busta
1996–97: Robert E. Smith
1997–98: Mary K. Wagner
1998–99: Bruce R. Stillings
1999–2000: Charles E. Manley
2000–01: Mary K. Schmidl
2001–02: Philip E. Nelson
2002–03: Mark R. McLellan
2003–04: C. Ann Hollingsworth
2004–05: Herbert F. Stone
2005–06: Margaret A. Lawson
2006–07: Dennis R. Heldman
2007–08: John D. Floros
2008–09: Sheri Schellhaass
2009–10: Marianne Gillette
2010-11: Robert B. Gravani
2011–12: Roger A. Clemens
2012–13: John Ruff
2013–14: Janet Collins
2014–15: Mary Ellen Camire
2015–16: Colin Dennis
2016–17: John Coupland
2019: Michele Perchonok

References
Official website

Food technology organizations